Hassan Latif (1916 – 9 November 1979) was a Pakistani music director known for composing popular film songs like, "Ja apni hasraton pe aanson baha ke sou ja" (Film: Susral 1962) and "Gaadi ko chalana babu zara halkay halkay" (Film: Anokhi 1956). Latif composed a 'Naat' for the film "Noor-e-Islam" (1957), "Shah-e-Madina Yathrib Ke Waali", that is still regarded as a classic.

Early life and career
Hassan was born in 1916 in Sahiwal, Punjab, British India. He started his career as a music director with an Urdu film "Judai" that was released in 1950. He composed only one song, "Gaari ko chalana babu" for the movie "Anokhi" (1956) that became very popular, while rest of the songs of the movie were composed by a visiting Indian musician Timar Barn. Hassan's first breakthrough was a religious-themed movie, "Noor-e-Islam" (1957). He composed an Urdu naat for the movie, "Shah-e-Madina Yathrib Ke Waali Saray Nabi Teray Dar Ke Sawaali" that is popular till date and is a necessary nasheed for Mawlid observations. It was originally vocalized by Saleem Raza, but many other singers also sang it in the later decades.

Hassan composed a Punjabi chorus song for movie, "Lukan Meeti" (1959), "Kokla chhupa ke jumeraat ayi jay" that became a favorite play song for kids in Punjab. It was sang by Zubaida Khanum and Co. In 1962, he gave music for an Urdu movie, "Susraal" that happened to be the climax of his film career. The film was a musical hit with songs like, "Ja apni hasraton pe aanson baha ke sou ja" (Singer: Noor Jehan) and "Jis ne meray dil ko dard diya" (Singer: Mehdi Hassan).

Hassan composed 165 songs in 28 Urdu and Punjabi movies. His last film as a music director was "Balwant Kaur" that was filmed in 1975 but released after his death in 1988.

Popular compositions
 Gari Ko Chalana, Babu, Zara Halkay Halkay Halkay... (Film: Anokhi - 1956), Singer(s): Zubaida Khanum, Poet: Fayyaz Hashmi
 Shah-e-Madina (saw), Yasrib Kay Wali, Saray Nabi Teray.. (Film: Noor-e- Islam - 1957), Singer(s): Saleem Raza & Co., Poet: Naeem Hashmi
 Kokla Chhupa Kay Jumerat Ayi Jay, Jehra Murh Kay Takkay... (Film: Lukkan Mitti - 1959), Singer(s): Zubaida Khanum & Co., Poet: Traditional Punjabi folk song
 Ja, Apni Hasraton Par, Ansoo Baha Kay So Ja... (Film: Susral - 1962), Singer(s): Noor Jehan, Poet: Munir Niazi
 Jis Nay Meray Dil Ko Dard Diya, Us Shakal Ko Main Nay Bhulaya Nahin... (Film: Susral - 1962), Singer(s): Mehdi Hassan, Poet: Munir Niazi
 Kabhi Muskara, Kabhi Jhoom Ja, Kabhi Aah Bhar Kay..... (Film: Susral - 1962), Singer(s): Ahmed Rushdi, Poet: Munir Niazi 
 Kiasay Kaisay Log, Hamaray Dil Ko Jalanay Aa Jatay Hayn... (Film: Teray Shehar Mein - 1965), Singer(s): Mehdi Hassan, Poet: Munir Niazi
 Zindagi, Majboor Hay, Lachar Hay, Sans Lena Bhi Yahan Dushwar Hay... (Film: Barsat Main - 1962), Singer(s): Saleem Raza, Poet: Tanvir Naqvi
 Log Dekhen Na Tamasha, Meri Ruswai Ka...(Film: Maan, Bahu Aur Beta - 1966), Singer(s): Noor Jehan, Poet: Habib Jalib

Death
Hassan died on November 9, 1979, in Lahore.

References

External links
 

1916 births
1979 deaths
People from Sahiwal
Pakistani composers
Pakistani film score composers